Berkeley Sound is an inlet, or fjord in the north east of East Falkland in the Falkland Islands. The inlet was the site of the first attempts at colonisation of the islands, at Port Louis, by the French.

Berkeley Sound has several smaller bays within it – Uranie Bay, Port Louis harbour and Johnson's Harbour bay, separated by Grave Point, and includes islands such as Hog Island, Kidney Island (a nature reserve) and Long Island. It was enlarged as the result of glacial action.

Berkeley Sound was visited by Charles Darwin during his round-the-world voyage on HMS Beagle in 1834. He found it an "undulating land, with a desolate and wretched aspect".

Berkeley Sound is used by the fishing industry as a designated locality for the transshipment of fish, with accidental oil spills having occurred in the process.

Settlements
 Green Patch
 Johnson's Harbour
 Port Louis
 Port Louis South

Sources

East Falkland
Inlets of the Falkland Islands
Fjords
Ports and harbours of the Falkland Islands